Makalo is a traditional Macedonian side dish. The main ingredients include oil, garlic and peppers although variations in the recipe can also include dry embroidered peppers, mashed potatoes, aubergine, leek and onion. It is usually served as an addition to stews or as a spread on bread.

Etymology
The name makalo comes from the Macedonian verb "to dip" (transliterated as maka) to describe how this side dish is usually used. There are several variations of the dish in North Macedonia, including the one from Ohrid, lukarnik which is served in the town of Veles.

Gallery

See also
 Balkan cuisine
 Eastern European cuisine

References

Macedonian cuisine
Balkan cuisine